Dan White (March 25, 1908 – July 7, 1980) was an American actor, well known for appearing in Western films and TV shows.

Biography

Early life
Dan White was born to George and Orpha White in Falmouth, Florida, one of thirteen siblings. The Whites moved to Lakeland during World War I. By age 14, White was in show business. He left home to travel thousands of miles throughout the South in tent, minstrel, vaudeville and theater shows. His brother Willard joined him for nine years in a show in Tampa's Rialto Theatre. Frances Langford worked with White during the time, and he convinced her to go to Hollywood. During this period, he met Tilda Spivey and proposed marriage on February 25, 1933. She had a 2-year-old child, Arthur Gifford, from a previous marriage. Dan left show business for financial reasons to work with the Civilian Conservation Corps. He still longed for a career in entertainment and took a cruise to Los Angeles. He and his family made extra stops at cities all over the country to earn money to continue the tour.

In January 1937, he stopped at Texarkana, Arkansas, where Tilda awaited the birth of their child. Her sister, Mary, who was in Texarkana, invited the Whites to stay there for a few months. The baby, June Larue White, was finally born, and the Whites continued toward California.

In Hollywood
They arrived 16 days later and rented a house for 23 years; where even film scripts were written in their own living room. Dan had a hard time finding a job and was in Costa Rica working on the Pan American Highway. Although, upon return in 1938, he got work with the Republic Pictures Corporation, making 6 films in his first year. The first film was, Prairie Moon, with Gene Autry. White made $55 a week during that picture. He'd claimed to have made about 300 films and 150 television cameos during his years in Hollywood. Around 70 percent were Westerns. Among some of his well-known films were, The Yearling, Distant Drums, Red River, To Kill a Mockingbird, Giant, Duel in the Sun, Four Faces West, Jailhouse Rock and Touch of Evil. During this time, White and his wife had a third child, Donald Curtis White, born on November 9, 1941. The films that made White most famous were his numerous appearances in B-Westerns, where he portrayed the antagonist. During the 1950s and 1960s, he started turning to television. He was offered the role of, "Sam the Bartender," in, Gunsmoke, but he didn't commit to the idea. He asked his best friend Glenn Strange to apply for the job instead.

Post-acting
Dan loved California for the almost 40 years he was there, but his true love was his old town in Florida. Upon retirement, he returned to Tampa and made appearances in Western Film Round-Ups and talk shows. He was often visited by his family until his death on July 7, 1980, in Tampa, Florida.

Dan was honored with a star on the Walk of Western Stars (Santa Clarita, California) on April 11, 2019.

Selected filmography 
Note: An asterisk (*) means that Dan White had an uncredited role; two asterisks means that he was credited as either Daniel White or Daniel M. White.

Everybody's Old Man (1936) - (uncredited)
Born to Be Wild (1938) - Striker (uncredited)
Murder in the Family (1938) - Minor Role
Prairie Moon (1938)* - Henchman Joe (uncredited)
Shine On, Harvest Moon (1938) - Rancher (uncredited)
Rough Rider's Round-Up (1939)* - Border Patrolman (uncredited)
The Law Comes to Texas (1939)* - Scout (uncredited)
In Old Monterey (1939)* - Man at Meeting (uncredited)
The Fighting Renegade (1939) - Henchman (uncredited)
Jeepers Creepers (1939) - Townsman (uncredited)
Rovin' Tumbleweeds (1939) - Townsman (uncredited)
Destry Rides Again (1939)* - Barfly (uncredited)
El Diablo Rides (1939) - Henchman (uncredited)
Death Rides the Range (1939) - Townsman (uncredited)
Gone with the Wind (1939) - Minor Role (uncredited)
Days of Jesse James (1939)* - Irate Townsman (uncredited)
The Grapes of Wrath (1940)* - Poor Man Walking with Woman in Transient Camp (uncredited)
Beyond Tomorrow (1940) - Gas Station Attendant (uncredited)
Our Town (1940)* - Wedding Guest Talking to Constable (uncredited)
Adventures of Red Ryder (1940, Serial) - Townsman [Ch. 2] (uncredited)
Deadwood Dick (1940, Serial) - Bank Teller / Stage Agent (uncredited)
The Howards of Virginia (1940) - Will (uncredited)
Too Many Girls (1940) - Faculty Extra (uncredited)
She Couldn't Say No (1940) - Courtroom Spectator (uncredited)
Back Street (1941) - Man at Ship's Ramp (uncredited)
Prairie Pioneers (1941)* - Settler / Soldier (uncredited)
The Singing Hill (1941) - Rancher (uncredited)
The Lone Rider in Ghost Town (1941) - Townsman (uncredited)
The Parson of Panamint (1941) - Hotel / Street Brawl Extra (uncredited)
The Lone Rider in Frontier Fury (1941) - Saloon Gambler (uncredited)
The Lone Rider Ambushed (1941) - Henchman (uncredited)
Texas (1941) - Ringsider (uncredited)
Lone Star Law Men (1941) - Henchman (uncredited)
Forbidden Trails (1941) - Barfly (uncredited)
Junior G-Men of the Air (1942, Serial) - Spectator (uncredited)
Juke Girl (1942)* - Bartender at Muckeye's / Timmony Driver (uncredited)
Tumbleweed Trail (1942) - Henchman (uncredited)
Sheriff of Sage Valley (1942)* - Rancher (uncredited)
Overland Stagecoach (1942)* - Railroad Worker (uncredited)
I Married a Witch (1942) - Fireman (uncredited)
Border Patrol (1943) - Henchman (uncredited)
Lady of Burlesque (1943)* - Man in Audience (uncredited)
Death Rides the Plains (1943) - Townsman (uncredited)
Batman (1943, Serial) - Mover with Pickup Truck (uncredited)
Fighting Valley (1943)* - Jeff Kelly (uncredited)
The Black Hills Express (1943) - Townsman (uncredited)
The Renegade (1943) - Henchman (uncredited)
Trail of Terror (1943)* - Al - Relay Station Man (uncredited)
The Kansan (1943) - Barfly (uncredited)
Arizona Trail (1943) - Sheriff Jones
Here Comes Kelly (1943) - Pool Hall Patron / Ringsider (uncredited)
Blazing Guns (1943) - Henchman Trigger
Outlaws of Stampede Past (1943) - Kurt - Murdered Cowhand
False Colors (1943)* - Bar Spectator (uncredited)
Boss of Rawhide (1943) - Minstrel
Smart Guy (1943) - Sheriff
The Phantom (1943, Serial)* - Braddock (uncredited)
Westward Bound (1944) - Henchman Wade
Marshal of Gunsmoke (1944)* - Ed Gardner (uncredited)
Outlaw Roundup (1944) - Bartender Louie (uncredited)
Voodoo Man (1944) - Deputy
Arizona Whirlwind (1944) - Jim Lockwood
Frontier Outlaws (1944) - Stagecoach Guard (uncredited)
Shine On, Harvest Moon (1944) - Rancher (uncredited)
Guns of the Law (1944) - Henchman (uncredited)
The Story of Dr. Wassell (1944) - Clerk in Admiral's Office (uncredited)
Valley of Vengeance (1944) - Settler (uncredited)
The Invisible Man's Revenge (1944)* - Pub Patron (uncredited)
Fuzzy Settles Down (1944) - Man at Auction (uncredited)
Raiders of Ghost City (1944, Serial) - Soldier [Chs. 3-5] (uncredited)
The Utah Kid (1944) - Henchman Slim
Gangsters of the Frontier (1944) - Townsman in Mayor's Office (uncredited)
Black Arrow (1944)* - Paul Brent (uncredited)
Mystery of the River Boat (1944, Serial) - Citizen (uncredited)
The Great Mike (1944) - Sam McBride
Harmony Trail (1944) - Bronco
Crazy Knights (1944) - Electrician
The Big Bonanza (1944)* - Rancher Willis (uncredited)
Rough Ridin' Justice (1945)* - Henchman Mike (uncredited)
Sudan (1945) - Man (uncredited)
The Return of the Durango Kid (1945)* - Kirby Henchman (uncredited)
Beyond the Pecos (1945)* - Sheriff (uncredited)
Both Barrels Blazing (1945) - Henchman Poker Player (uncredited)
Trail to Vengeance (1945)* - Henchman Clancy (uncredited)
Flaming Bullets (1945) - Henchman (uncredited)
Frontier Feud (1945) - Townsman (uncredited)
San Antonio (1945)* - Joey Simms (uncredited)
Gun Town (1946) - Joe - Henchman
Gunman's Code (1946) - Townsman (uncredited)
The Yearling (1946)* - Millwheel Forrester (uncredited)
Duel in the Sun (1946)* - Ed, the Wrangler (uncredited)
The Sea of Grass (1947)* - Wake - Brewton Ranch Hand (uncredited)
Albuquerque (1948) - Henchman Jackson
The Westward Trail (1948) - Henchman (uncredited)
Silver River (1948) - Miner (uncredited)
I Wouldn't Be in Your Shoes (1948) - Prisoner
Shaggy (1948) - Joe Simms
Four Faces West (1948) - Clint Waters
The Walls of Jericho (1948) - Loafer (uncredited)
Red River (1948)* - Laredo (uncredited)
Station West (1948)* - Pete
Sunset Carson Rides Again (1948) - Sheriff Norton
Unknown Island (1948)** - Crewman Edwards
Gunning for Justice (1948) - Sheriff
Outlaw Country (1949) - Jim McCord
Dynamite (1949)* - Skipper Brown (uncredited)
Cover-Up (1949) - Gabe
South of St. Louis (1949) - Sentry (uncredited)
El Paso (1949) - Henchman (uncredited)
She Wore a Yellow Ribbon (1949) - Trooper (uncredited)
The Cowboy and the Indians (1949) - Farmer (uncredited)
Intruder in the Dust (1949)* - Will Legate (uncredited)
Roseanna McCoy (1949) - Abel Hatfield
Return of the Frontiersman (1950) - Nicol
The Gunfighter (1950) - Card Player in Barber Shop (uncredited)
A Lady Without Passport (1950) - Airport Dispatcher (uncredited)
Never a Dull Moment (1950) - Shivaree Partyer (uncredited)
Vengeance Valley (1951)* - Cowhand at Campfire (uncredited)
Sugarfoot (1951) - Rancher (uncredited)
Oh! Susanna (1951) - Clerk (uncredited)
Rawhide (1951) - Gilchrist (uncredited)
Raton Pass (1951) - Scout (uncredited)
Comin' Round the Mountain (1951) - Mountaineer
David and Bathsheba (1951) - Soldier Who Touches the Ark of the Covenant (uncredited)
His Kind of Woman (1951)* - Tex Kearns (uncredited)
The Tall Target (1951) - Passenger in Club Car (uncredited)
The Red Badge of Courage (1951)* - Sergeant (uncredited)
Texas Carnival (1951) - Card Player (uncredited)
Drums in the Deep South (1951) - Cpl. Jennings
Red Mountain (1951) - Jim Braden, Assayer
Distant Drums (1951)* - Cpl. Peachtree (uncredited)
The Frontier Phantom (1952)* - Crayden Man (uncredited)
Wait 'Til the Sun Shines, Nellie (1952) - Doc Thomas (uncredited)
The Lusty Men (1952) - Rodeo Announcer #1 (uncredited)
Horizons West (1952)* - Dennis (uncredited)
She Couldn't Say No (1952) - Harley Burger (uncredited)
The Silver Whip (1953) - Deputy Dodd Burdette (uncredited)
Born to the Saddle (1953) - Sheriff
Inferno (1953) - Lee - Ranch Hand (uncredited)
A Lion Is in the Streets (1953) - Coroner (uncredited)
Gun Fury (1953) - Sheepman (uncredited)
Jubilee Trail (1954)* - Henry (uncredited)
Taza, Son of Cochise (1954) - Tiswin Charlie
Tennessee Champ (1954) - Baptist Minister (uncredited)
Yankee Pasha (1954) - Dan - Fur Trader (uncredited)
Suddenly (1954)* - Burg - Desk Officer (uncredited)
The Country Girl (1954) - Man (uncredited)
The Americano (1955) - Barney Dent
Rage at Dawn (1955) - Train Conductor (uncredited)
The Man from Bitter Ridge (1955) - Bender (uncredited)
The Road to Denver (1955)* - Man in Buckboard
The Tall Men (1955) - Hotel Clerk in San Antonio (uncredited)
The Twinkle in God's Eye (1955) - Townsman (uncredited)
Glory (1956) - Glory's Horse Trainer (uncredited)
Red Sundown (1956) - Durango Saloon Patron (uncredited)
The Last Hunt (1956)* - Deputy (uncredited)
Great Day in the Morning (1956)* - Rogers (uncredited)
Thunder Over Arizona (1956) - Mel Hogan (uncredited)
The First Traveling Saleslady (1956)** - Sheriff
Gun Brothers (1956)* - Jonathan Logan, Mormon Minister (uncredited)
The Ten Commandments (1956) - Slave (uncredited)
Giant (1956)* - Truck Driver in Diner (uncredited)
The Rainmaker (1956) - Deputy (uncredited)
The Lonely Man (1957) - Butcher (uncredited)
Band of Angels (1957) - Trader (uncredited)
Escape from San Quentin (1957) - Border Guard (uncredited)
Jailhouse Rock (1957)* - Paymaster (uncredited)
Gunfire at Indian Gap (1957) - Fred Moran
Escape from Red Rock (1957)** - Al Farris
Touch of Evil (1958)* - Customs Officer (uncredited)
Quantrill's Raiders (1958) - Fred Thomas
The Sheepman (1958) - Rancher (uncredited)
The Proud Rebel (1958) - Court Clerk (uncredited)
Frontier Gun (1958) - Sam Kilgore
Gunmen from Laredo (1959) - Jury Foreman (uncredited)
King of the Wild Stallions (1959) - Hawks (uncredited)
This Earth is Mine (1959) - Judge Gruber
The Big Fisherman (1959) - Minor Role (uncredited)
Attack of the Giant Leeches (1959) - Porky Reed
Beloved Infidel (1959)* - Bookshop Proprietor (uncredited)
Ma Barker's Killer Brood (1960)** - Sheriff #2
The Sergeant Was a Lady (1961) - Gen. Payson
Lonely Are the Brave (1962) - Convict (uncredited)
The Wild Westerners (1962) - Sheriff (uncredited)
To Kill a Mockingbird (1962)* - Mob Leader (uncredited)
The Cardinal (1963) - Lamar (uncredited)
A Tiger Walks (1964)* - Tom Baker (uncredited)
The Bounty Killer (1965)* - Marshal Davis
Jesse James Meets Frankenstein's Daughter (1966) - Townsman Laughing at Sheriff
Waco (1966) - Townsman
Red Tomahawk (1967) - Ned Crone
The Fastest Guitar Alive (1967) - Preacher (uncredited)
The Cheyenne Social Club (1970) - Barfly Getting Up from Table (uncredited)
Beyond the Valley of the Dolls (1970) - Dr. Scholl (uncredited)
The Cheyenne Social Club (1970, TV Movie) - Man Representing Florida (uncredited)
Skyjacked (1972) - Weber's Father
Smoke in the Wind (1975) - Col. Joab Cullen
Beyond the Bermuda Triangle (1975, TV Movie) - Caldas
Black Sunday (1977 film) (1977) - Man in Edward Hotel Elevator (uncredited)

Television

 The Lone Ranger (1953) - John Portis
 Hopalong Cassidy (1953) - Bearcat Smith
 The Adventures of Kit Carson (1954) - Todd Weaver
 The Cisco Kid (1954) - Sheriff / Alan Moxley / Brace Haggar
 Climax! (1954) - Ben Berry
 Adventures of Wild Bill Hickok (1952-1955) - Warner Laughton / Pinto
 Lux Video Theatre (1955) - Len Tollard
 Stories of the Century (1955) - Henchman Huck
 The Man Behind the Badge (1955) - Floyd / Caretaker
 Corky and White Shadow (1956) - Deputy Jeff
 Tales of the Texas Rangers (1956) - Sheriff 
 Screen Directors Playhouse (1956) - 4th Farmer
 Telephone Time (1956) - Ed
 The Adventures of Jim Bowie (1956) - Settler
 West Point (1956) - Amby Bracken
 Cavalcade of America (1953-1956) - Stan
 Red Ryder (1956) - Sheriff
 Sheriff of Cochise (1957) - Charlie Desmond
 Science Fiction Theatre (1957) - Bud
 Circus Boy (1957) - Ben Otis / Sheriff / Gus
 Adventures of Superman (1957) - Mike
 The Ford Television Theatre (1957) - Mr. Harris
 Casey Jones (1957) - Sam Peterson 
 Highway Patrol (1957-1958) - Pete Burgess / Joe Valentine
 Broken Arrow (1958) - Roberts
 From These Roots (1958) - Dan Fraser (1958-1960)
 Northwest Passage (1959) - Mercer (uncredited)
 The Californians (1958-1959) - Roadhouse Proprietor / Turnkey
 Lassie (1959) - Amos Lovejoy
 Wanted: Dead or Alive (1960) - Stableman (uncredited)
 Overland Trail (1960) - Miner (uncredited)
 Wichita Town (1960) - Salty
 Bat Masterson (1960) - S2E21 "Cattle and Canes" as Rancher Ben Taylor
 The Texan (1959-1960) - Mulligan / Sheriff Dawson
 Thriller (1960) - Doctor
 General Electric Theater (1960) - Sheriff
 The Deputy (1959-1960) - Joab Sharpe / Sheriff Wilks
 Twilight Zone (1961) - Man #2 (uncredited)
 Sugarfoot (1957-1961) Cowhand / Kennedy
 The Rebel (1961) - Corby 
 Maverick (1958-1961) - Poe / Stableman
 The Life and Legend of Wyatt Earp (1955-1961) - Zack Burton / Townsman / Witness / Judge Norton / Wilkins - Second Prisoner in Line
 Bat Masterson (1960-1961) - Sheriff Bart Sloane / Ben Taylor
 Checkmate (1961) - Man
 Walt Disney's Wonderful World of Color (1958-1961) - Storekeeper / William Ryan / Deputy (uncredited)
 Outlaws (1961) - Wagon Driver (uncredited)
 Sea Hunt (1961, Season 4, Episode 28) - Sheriff Wyatt Walsh
 Cheyenne (1961) - Man
 Rawhide (1959-1962) - Sheriff of Elkville / Windy
 Tales of Wells Fargo (1958-1962) - Pete the Bartender / Matt Gray / Nedy West / Miner Who Quit
 Laramie (1959-1962) - Pa Tilford / Stagecoach Driver / Pop - Telegrapher / Man of God / Townsman
 Have Gun - Will Travel (1962) - Sam - Henchman
 The Rifleman (1958-1963) - Russell / Cowboy on Trail
 Wagon Train (1958-1963) - Taggert / Wagon Driver / Joe Lassiter
 Ripcord (1962-1963) - Mr. Ledbetter / Replaced / Simmons
 Destry (1964) - Stableman (uncredited)
 Flipper (1965) - Captain Bender
 Bob Hope Presents the Chrysler Theatre (1963-1966) - Fred
 The Beverly Hillbillies (1966) - Man
 Petticoat Junction (1965-1966) - Homer Overstreet / 1st Juror
 Green Acres (1965-1967) - Man
 Bonanza (196-1967) - Townsman #2 / Stableman / Weems / Tom / Stableman / Simms / Station Agent / Zeke Jackson
 The Name of the Game (1970) - Sheriff Prentiss
 The High Chaparral (1967-1970) - Dirt Smith / Sheriff Prentiss / Bob Willis
 The Virginian (1962-1970) - Conductor / Stableman / Baggage Man / Edwards / Fox
 Adam-12 (1971) - Benny
 Gunsmoke (1960-1972) - Oldtimer / Stocker / Attendant / Bartender / Dan - Bartender / Ainsley
 Barnaby Jones (1973)
 Mannix (1973) - Steve (uncredited)

References

External links

 
 http://www.b-westerns.com/villan33.htm at The Old Corral http://www.b-westerns.com/
 https://scvhistory.com/scvhistory/tv1903.htm
 https://scvhistory.com/scvhistory/lw2102.htm

American male film actors
Civilian Conservation Corps people
1908 births
1980 deaths
Vaudeville performers
20th-century American male actors
Male Western (genre) film actors
People from Suwannee County, Florida